Rozhdestveno is a rural locality (a village) in Andreyevskoye Rural Settlement, Alexandrovsky District, Vladimir Oblast, Russia. The population was 11 as of 2010. There are 5 streets.

Geography 
Rozhdestveno is located 11 km southeast of Alexandrov (the district's administrative centre) by road. Samarino is the nearest rural locality.

References 

Rural localities in Alexandrovsky District, Vladimir Oblast